Magnetic resonance can mean:

Magnetic resonance, a physical process

Physics

Magnetic resonance (quantum mechanics), a quantum resonance process
Nuclear magnetic resonance, a special case
Electron paramagnetic resonance
Nuclear magnetic resonance quantum computer

Medicine
Magnetic resonance imaging (MRI), a medical imaging technique
Functional magnetic resonance imaging (fMRI), an MRI technique to measure brain activity
Magnetic resonance neurography (MRN), an MRI technique to image nerves
Cardiac magnetic resonance imaging (CMR), an MRI technique to assess the cardiovascular system
Magnetic resonance angiography (MRA), an MRI technique to image blood vessels
Magnetic resonance cholangiopancreatography (MRCP), an MRI technique to image biliary and pancreatic ducts
Endorectal coil magnetic resonance imaging, an MRI technique to image the area surrounding the rectum
Delayed gadolinium-enhanced magnetic resonance imaging of cartilage (dGEMRIC), an MRI technique to image cartilage 
Magnetic resonance elastography (MRE), an MRI technique to measure tissue stiffness
Interventional magnetic resonance imaging (IMRI) a technique using MRI to guide medical interventions
Magnetic resonance spectroscopic imaging, an MRI technique to gather cellular activity and metabolic information
Magnetic resonance therapy, a proposed treatment based on the principles of magnetic resonance

Spectroscopy
Nuclear magnetic resonance spectroscopy, a technique to determine properties of atoms or molecules
Two-dimensional nuclear magnetic resonance spectroscopy
Nuclear magnetic resonance spectroscopy of proteins
Nuclear magnetic resonance spectroscopy of carbohydrates
Nuclear magnetic resonance spectroscopy of nucleic acids
In vivo magnetic resonance spectroscopy
Solid-state nuclear magnetic resonance spectroscopy
Triple-resonance nuclear magnetic resonance spectroscopy
Nuclear magnetic resonance decoupling
Nuclear magnetic resonance crystallography
Electron paramagnetic resonance spectroscopy, a technique to study materials with unpaired electrons
Pulsed electron paramagnetic resonance
Ferromagnetic resonance, a technique to study ferromagnetic materials

Microscopy
Magnetic resonance microscopy, an MRI technique used down to the scale of 5-10 cubic micrometers
Magnetic resonance force microscopy, an MRI technique used on nanometer and smaller scales

Other uses
Magnetic Resonance Imaging (journal)
Magnetic Resonance in Medicine, journal
Magnetic Resonance in Chemistry, journal
Erwin L. Hahn institute for magnetic resonance imaging, in Essen, Germany